Transmembrane BAX inhibitor motif-containing protein 1 is a protein that in humans is encoded by the TMBIM1 gene.

References

Further reading